Androsthenes of Corinth defended Corinth against the Romans in 198 BCE, and was defeated in the following year by the Achaeans.

Notes

 

2nd-century BC Greek people
Soldiers of ancient Corinth